Goliath (2012) is a graphic novel by Tom Gauld, published by Drawn & Quarterly. It is Gauld's first long-form book. 

The book is a retelling of the biblical story of the warrior Goliath.

Development 
Gauld wrote a story about the biblical figure of Noah in Kramers Ergot, issue 7 (2008). According to Gauld, it "was one of the things which led [him] to do Goliath."

The longer format of Goliath—compared to the author's previous work—made the book more challenging to work on, according to Gauld.

Awards and nominations 

 YALSA (Young Adult Library Service Association) Great Graphic Novel (2013)
Nominated for an Eisner Award for Best Graphic Album (2013)
Nominated for British Comic Award

References

External links
 Official website of Tom Gauld

2012 graphic novels